Τholos may refer to: 
 Tholos (architecture), a circular structure, often a temple, of ancient Greece and ancient Rome, and in classical or neoclassical architecture
Tholos (Ancient Rome), a structure found in the centre of the macellum
Tholos (Athens), a building which housed the Prytaneion, or seat of government, in ancient Athens
Tholos of Delphi, a circular building located approximately 800 metres from the main site of the ruined Temple of Apollo at Delphi
Tholos (Epidaurus), a circular building with an ornate astronomical floor design
Tholos (Washington DC), the highest part of the United States Capitol dome, on which the Statue of Freedom stands
Tholos tomb, or beehive tomb 
Tholos, keyhole-shaped houses of the Halaf culture of the Ancient Near East
Tholos, an alternative name of Theologos, Rhodes, a village in Greece